Palhinhaea is a genus of lycophytes in the family Lycopodiaceae. In the Pteridophyte Phylogeny Group classification of 2016 (PPG I), it is placed in the subfamily Lycopodielloideae. Some sources do not recognize the genus, sinking it into Lycopodiella. Palhinhaea species are widespread in the tropics and subtropics.

Species
, the Checklist of Ferns and Lycophytes of the World recognized the following species:

Palhinhaea bradei (Nessel) Holub
Palhinhaea brevibracteata (Alderw.) Holub
Palhinhaea camporum (B.Øllg. & P.G.Windisch) Holub
Palhinhaea cernua (L.) Vasc. & Franco
Palhinhaea cerrojefensis B.Øllg.
Palhinhaea crassifolia (Spring) Fraser-Jenk. & Kholia
Palhinhaea curvata (Sw.) Holub
Palhinhaea descendens (B.Øllg.) Holub
Palhinhaea divaricata B.Øllg.
Palhinhaea eichleri (Fée) Holub
Palhinhaea glaucescens (C.Presl) Holub
Palhinhaea hainanensis C.Y.Yang
Palhinhaea hydrophila (Alderw.) comb. ined., currently Lycopodiella hydrophila (Alderw.) P.J.Edwards – New Guinea
Palhinhaea lehmannii (Hieron.) Holub
Palhinhaea lugubris B.Øllg.
Palhinhaea maniculata (B.Øllg.) B.Øllg.
Palhinhaea pendulina (Hook.) Holub
Palhinhaea pseudocurvata B.Øllg.
Palhinhaea pungens (Alderw.) Holub
Palhinhaea raiateensis (J.W.Moore) comb. ined., currently Lycopodium raiateense J.W.Moore – Society Islands
Palhinhaea reflexifolia B.Øllg.
Palhinhaea riofrioi (Sodiro) Holub
Palhinhaea steyermarkii (B.Øllg.) Holub
Palhinhaea tomentosa (Alderw.) Holub
Palhinhaea torta (Sieber ex Underw. & F.E.Lloyd) Christenh.
Palhinhaea trianae (Hieron.) Holub
Palhinhaea veigae Vasc. (epithet is also wrongly spelt viegae)

References

Lycopodiaceae
Lycophyte genera